The Donald Pollock House is a historic house in Oklahoma City, Oklahoma.  Designed by architect Bruce Goff, Nelson Brackin accompanied Goff in the renovation for Laura and Joe Warriner in 1966.

Description and history 
The house, designed by Bruce Goff and constructed in 1957, features steep hipped roofs over interlocking square areas, with skylights. The interior is partitioned by folding wood partitions. A studio with a screened porch on its roof is connected by a walkway over a reflecting pool.

Its NRHP nomination describes it as "an excellent example of the mature architecture of Bruce Goff" and "one of Goff's finest designs". It is related to the Goff-designed Wilson House in Pensacola, Florida. It was listed on the National Register of Historic Places on December 13, 2001.

References

Bruce Goff buildings
Residential buildings in Oklahoma City
Houses completed in 1957
Houses on the National Register of Historic Places in Oklahoma
Houses in Canadian County, Oklahoma
National Register of Historic Places in Oklahoma City